Tripura West Lok Sabha constituency is one of two Lok Sabha constituencies in Tripura state in northeastern India. It includes the state capital Agartala. The seat is currently vacant as Pratima Bhowmik, current MP has elected to the Legislative Assembly of the state.

Assembly segments
Tripura West Lok Sabha constituency is composed of the following assembly segments:

Members of Parliament

Election results

General elections 2019

General elections 2014

General elections 2009

General elections 2004

Bye election 2002
A by-election was held in this constituency on 12 November 2002 which was necessitated by the Death of sitting MP Samar Chowdhury. In the by-election, Khagen Das of CPI(M) defeated his nearest rival Manik Deb of Congress by 1,50,843 votes.

General elections 1999

See also
 List of Constituencies of the Lok Sabha
 Tripura East (Lok Sabha constituency)

References

External links
Tripura West lok sabha  constituency election 2019 date and schedule

Lok Sabha constituencies in Tripura
Politics of Tripura